The 2011–12 Grand Prix of Figure Skating Final was an international figure skating competition in the 2011–12 season. The ISU Junior Grand Prix Final was organized together with the senior event. The two competitions were the culmination of two international series, the 2011–12 ISU Grand Prix of Figure Skating for senior-level skaters and the 2011–12 ISU Junior Grand Prix for juniors.

The competitions were held in Quebec City, Canada at the Pavillon de la Jeunesse, from December 8–11, 2011. Medals were awarded in the disciplines of men's singles, ladies' singles, pair skating, and ice dancing on the senior and junior levels.

Medalists

Senior

Junior

Medals table

Schedule
(Local time, UTC/GMT -05:00):

 Wednesday, December 7
 09:00–16:50 – Official practices
 Thursday, December 8
 08:30–15:40 – Official practices
 16:05–16:40 – Opening ceremony
 17:00–17:54 – Junior: Pairs' short
 18:15–19:01 – Junior: Ladies' short
 19:20–20:12 – Junior: Short dance
 20:35–21:21 – Junior: Men's short
 Friday, December 9
 06:45–10:55 – Official practices
 11:25–12:26 – Junior: Pairs' free
 13:00–13:46 – Senior: Ladies' short
 14:05–14:57 – Senior: Short dance
 15:00–15:10 – Victory ceremony: Junior pairs
 18:30–19:20 – Junior: Ladies' free
 19:25–19:35 – Victory ceremony: Junior ladies
 20:00–20:54 – Senior: Pairs' short
 21:15–22:01 – Senior: Men's short
 Saturday, December 10
 08:00–13:45 – Official practices
 14:20–15:16 – Junior: Free dance
 15:40–16:33 – Senior: Ladies' free
 16:55–17:52 – Senior: Men's free
 17:55–18:30 – Victory ceremonies: Senior ladies, Junior ice dancing, Senior men
 19:00–19:55 – Junior: Men's free
 20:15–21:20 – Senior: Pairs' free
 21:25–21:55 – Victory ceremonies: Junior men, Senior pairs
 Sunday, December 11
 08:15–12:40 – Official practices
 13:50–14:52 – Senior: Free dance
 14:55–15:10 – Victory ceremony: Senior ice dancing
 16:00–18:30 – Exhibitions

Qualifiers

Senior-level qualifiers
Skaters who reached the age of 14 by July 1, 2011 were eligible to compete at two senior 2011–12 Grand Prix events, including the 2011 Skate America, 2011 Skate Canada International, 2011 Cup of China, 2011 NHK Trophy, 2011 Trophée Éric Bompard, and 2011 Cup of Russia. They earned points at these events and the six highest ranking skaters/teams qualified for the senior Grand Prix Final. The following skaters qualified for the 2011–12 Grand Prix Final.
 On December 8, it was announced that Mao Asada had withdrawn due to a family emergency. There was no replacement.

Junior-level qualifiers
Skaters who reached the age of 13 by July 1, 2011 but had not turned 19 (singles and females of the other two disciplines) or 21 (male pair skaters and ice dancers) were eligible to compete at two 2011–12 Junior Grand Prix events. They earned points at these events and the six highest ranking skaters/teams qualified for the Junior Grand Prix Final.
 On November 30, the U.S. pair team of Jessica Calalang / Zack Sidhu withdrew and were replaced by first alternates Tatiana Tudvaseva / Sergei Lisiev of Russia.

Prize money
The total prize money for the senior event was $272,000 USD and for the junior event, $105,000 USD.

All senior disciplines (couples split the sum):

Junior single skating:

Junior pairs and ice dancers (couples split the sum):

Senior-level results

Men
Chan won both segments to win his second Grand Prix Final title, while Takahashi pulled up from fifth in the short to win the silver medal. Fernandez was the first Spaniard to qualify for a Grand Prix Final and also the first to win a medal at the event.

Ladies
Kostner won the short program, with Suzuki in second and Leonova in third. Kostner also won the free skate to take the gold medal, while Suzuki and Leonova held on for silver and bronze respectively, despite Tuktamysheva placing second in the free. Kostner became the first Italian single skater to win the Grand Prix Final and is second overall after Barbara Fusar-Poli and Maurizio Margaglio, who won the ice dancing title in 2000. Mao Asada withdraw due to her mother's serious illness that led to her passing.

Pairs
The senior pairs produced the closest battle for gold, with only 0.18 points separating the top two at the end of the event. Volosozhar and Trankov placed first in the short program while Savchenko and Szolkowy were first in the free skate to win their third Grand Prix Final title.

Ice dancing
Davis and White won their third consecutive Grand Prix Final, while Virtue and Moir won the silver and Pechalat and Bourzat the bronze. According to the initial results, Davis and White won both segments of the competition but the ISU announced on December 28 that there had been a calculation error and that Virtue and Moir had won the free dance by 0.05. The ISU explained: "The calculation program used up to and including the ISU Grand Prix of Figure Skating Final had erroneously calculated the Dance result with the previous Grade of Execution (GOE) for the Combination Lift, which was upgraded with ISU Communication 1677 in July 2011."

Junior-level results

Junior men
Joshua Farris won the short program, with Jason Brown in second and Yan Han in third. Brown won the gold medal after placing second in the free skate, Yan won the segment to take the silver medal, and Farris took the bronze.

Junior ladies
Lipnitskaia won the short program, followed by Shelepen and Lam in second and third respectively. In the free skating, Lipnitskaia and Shelepen again placed first and second to win gold and silver, while Korobeynikova moved up from fifth to take the bronze medal and produce a Russian sweep.

Junior pairs
Sui and Han won the short program and the free skate to win their second Junior Grand Prix Final title. Bobak and Beharry won the silver medal while Simpson and Blackmer took the bronze, with both couples in their first season together.

Junior ice dancing
Sinitsina and Zhiganshin won the short dance over Yanovskaya and Mozgov. They then won the free dance to take the gold medal, while Stepanova and Bukin rebounded from a fall in the short dance to place second in the free but Yanovskaya and Mozgov stayed in second overall. Russia swept the podium.

References

External links

 
 Senior Grand Prix Final entries at the International Skating Union
 Junior Grand Prix Final entries at the International Skating Union
 Official Junior Grand Prix videos at the International Skating Union, YouTube channel

2011 in Canadian sports
2011 in figure skating
Grand Prix of Figure Skating Final
ISU Junior Grand Prix
Figure skating in Canada
2011 in youth sport
2012 in youth sport
December 2011 sports events in Canada